Lick Peak is located on the border of Alberta and British Columbia. It was named in 1921 by Arthur O. Wheeler.

See also
 List of peaks on the British Columbia–Alberta border
 Mountains of Alberta
 Mountains of British Columbia

References

Lick Peak
Lick Peak
Canadian Rockies